Gömeniç is a town in Balikesir Province in the Marmara Region of Turkey.
The town is at an altitude of 287 m (941 ft) above the Sea of Marmara and has a population of 2000
The Post code is 10770, and the population in 2007 was 297.
Gömeniç takes from the Gömeniç Castle, but in antiquity was known as Pionia.

The town is 27 km from Balikesir city center and 13 km from Ivrindi district,  The climate of the neighborhood is within the influence of the Marmara climate.

The town was a seat of a bishop during late antiquity and fell to the Ottoman Turks in 1345.

References 

Towns in Turkey